The Acer Liquid Z5 is a smartphone developed by Acer Inc. of Taiwan. It was announced at the 2014 Consumer Electronics Show in January 2014. The Liquid Z5 features a  diagonal LCD display and Android 4.2 Jelly Bean.

References

Android (operating system) devices
Liquid Z5
Mobile phones introduced in 2014